B-Sides and Confessions, Volume One is an album by American singer-songwriter Jeff Black, released in 2003.

Reception

Writing for Allmusic, critic Ronnie D. Lankford, Jr. wrote of the album; "These songs are brought to fullness by simple arrangements and a straightforward production... The only snag on B-Sides and Confessions is that most of the songs are fairly slow paced, which causes the last two-thirds of the album to blend together. The album nonetheless succeeds in offering a singer-songwriter effort that doesn't fall into the usual singer-songwriter clichés."

Track listing 
All songs by Jeff Black
 "Slip" – 2:46
 "Same Old River" – 5:05
 "Holy Roller" – 2:44
 "Sunday Best" – 5:06
 "To Be With You" – 4:55
 "Gold Heart Locket" – 4:05
 "Cakewalk" – 5:44
 "Bless My Soul" – 4:19
 "Bastard" – 4:57
 "Higher Ground" – 6:26

Personnel 
 Jeff Black – vocals, guitar, piano, keyboards, harmonica
 Byron House – bass
 David Jacques – double bass
 Michael Webb – bass
 Craig Wright – drums, percussion
Production notes
 Jeff Black – producer, art direction, design
 Gary Paczosa – engineer ("To Be With You")
 Billy Sherrill – engineer, mixing
 Jim DeMain – mastering
 Michael Wilson – photography

References 

2003 compilation albums
B-side compilation albums